Senina is the name of several rural localities in Russia:
Senina (Beloyevskoye Rural Settlement), Kudymkarsky District, Perm Krai, a village in Kudymkarsky District, Perm Krai
Senina (Verkh-Invenskoye Rural Settlement), Kudymkarsky District, Perm Krai, a village in Kudymkarsky District, Perm Krai